Carex macrorrhiza is a tussock-forming species of perennial sedge in the family Cyperaceae. It is native to parts of South America.

See also
List of Carex species

References

macrorrhiza
Taxa named by Johann Otto Boeckeler
Plants described in 1888
Flora of Bolivia
Flora of Chile
Flora of Argentina